Kingdom Yuen King-dan (苑瓊丹; born 11 September 1963) is a Hong Kong actress with a long history working with TVB.

Life and career
Kingdom was born in Hong Kong, her father was an ivory carver. She started her acting career with HK ATV during the mid 80s and left around 1995 to join rival station TVB. In between her TV career, Kingdom has been featured in many HK movies, including several with Stephen Chow's earlier films ("Forbidden City Cop", "God of Cookery", and "Hail the Judge"). Kingdom has a long history with comedy and she has heavily played comedic roles in most of her career. However, she doesn't wish to be typecast into comedic roles and strives to diversify herself in other roles. On July 11, 2004, she married her boyfriend, Huang Naiyang. After nearly 17 years with TVB, Kingdom decided to leave the station in 2012 and started filming dramas in mainland China. No longer tied to TVB, Kingdom was able to express her disapproval of TVB's rough treatment of their actors. While she continues filming new dramas in China, she still comes back to HK to film movies.

Filmography

References

1963 births
Living people
TVB veteran actors
20th-century Hong Kong actresses
21st-century Hong Kong actresses
Hong Kong women comedians